William Clay Cumming (July 27, 1788 – February 18, 1863)  was an American planter and soldier from Augusta, Georgia.

Early life
William Cumming was born in Augusta to Thomas and Ann (Clay) Cumming. He graduated from the College of New Jersey (later Princeton University) and studied law in Litchfield, Connecticut. When he returned to Augusta, he bought land and became a planter.

Military service
Cumming joined the militia, becoming captain of an independent company called the Augusta Blues. When the unit was mustered into the regular army for service in the War of 1812 he was commissioned as a major in the 8th Infantry. In February 1814 he was promoted to colonel and named as adjutant general for the Northern Army.

Colonel Cumming fought on the St. Lawrence frontier and in the Niagara campaign. He was cited for gallantry and leadership. He was lightly wounded in November 1813 at the Battle of Crysler's Farm. He was seriously wounded at the Battle of Lundy's Lane in July 1814. An extended period of hospitalization ended his participation in the war, and he resigned his commission in March 1815.

Planter and politician
When he returned home he resumed his career as a planter.

While active and outspoken in political arguments Cumming declined several offices, including an election by the state legislature to the United States Senate. In 1822 his strong support of state nullification, and his habit of strong criticism, led to an ongoing dispute with South Carolina Congressman George McDuffie, who favored deference to the federal government. He met McDuffie in a duel and wounded him. The bullet lodged in McDuffie's back and was never removed; the wound caused him to limp for the rest of his life.

Later life
In 1847, President Polk offered Cumming the rank of Major General to participate in the Mexican–American War, but his age and declining health caused him to turn down the offer. Cumming died in Augusta in 1863. The town of Cumming, Georgia is named in his honor.

References

External links
 Colonel William Cumming historical marker

1786 births
1863 deaths
United States Army officers
People from Augusta, Georgia
American planters